Rodrigo Riquelme Reche (born 2 April 2000), known as Roro, is a Spanish professional footballer who plays as a right winger for Girona, on loan from Atlético Madrid.

Club career

Atlético Madrid
Born in Madrid, Riquelme joined Atlético Madrid's youth setup in 2010 at the age of ten, after representing Rayo Vallecano and Real Zaragoza. He made his debut with the reserves on 16 March 2019, playing the last five minutes of a 0–1 Segunda División B away loss against SD Ponferradina.

Riquelme made his first team – and La Liga – debut on 1 September 2019, coming on as a late substitute for Thomas Lemar in a 3–2 home win over  SD Eibar.

Loan to Bournemouth
On 1 October 2020, Riquelme joined English Championship club AFC Bournemouth on a season-long loan, with Bournemouth having the option to make the move permanent. He made his debut for the club as a substitute in the 1-1 away draw against Cardiff City.  He scored his first goal for Bournemouth in a 1-1 draw with Derby County on 31 October 2020. Riquelme made his first start for the club in a 2-3 home loss to Preston.

Loan to Mirandés
On 30 August 2021, Riquelme moved to Segunda División side CD Mirandés on loan for the 2021–22 campaign. He was a regular starter for the side, scoring eight goals and providing 12 assists during the season.

Loan to Girona
On 1 August 2022, Riquelme was loaned to top tier side Girona FC for one year, after renewing his contract with Atleti until 2028.

Career statistics

References

External links

2000 births
Living people
Footballers from Madrid
Spanish footballers
Association football wingers
Atlético Madrid B players
Atlético Madrid footballers
AFC Bournemouth players
CD Mirandés footballers
Girona FC players
La Liga players
Segunda División players
Segunda División B players
English Football League players
Spain under-21 international footballers
Spanish expatriate footballers
Expatriate footballers in England
Spanish expatriate sportspeople in England